Acleris dispar is a species of moth of the family Tortricidae. It is found in China (Sichuan).

References

Moths described in 1987
dispar
Moths of Asia